Frederick Charles Moncrieff was a British colonial judge.

He was Puisne judge of the Supreme Court of Mauritius until March 1900, when he was appointed Puisne Justice of the Supreme Court of Ceylon, serving as such until 1905.

References

Citations

Bibliography

 

Puisne Justices of the Supreme Court of Ceylon
19th-century Sri Lankan people